In Roman and Greek mythology, Capys (Ancient Greek: Κάπυς) was a name attributed to three individuals:

Capys, king of Dardania.
Capys, the Trojan who warned not to bring the Trojan horse into the city.
Capys, mythological king of Alba Longa and descendant of Aeneas. Said to have reigned from 963 to 935 BC.

According to Roman sources, in the Etruscan language the word capys meant "hawk" or "falcon" (or possibly "eagle" or "vulture").

Notes

References 

 Dionysus of Halicarnassus, Roman Antiquities. English translation by Earnest Cary in the Loeb Classical Library, 7 volumes. Harvard University Press, 1937–1950. Online version at Bill Thayer's Web Site
 Dionysius of Halicarnassus, Antiquitatum Romanarum quae supersunt, Vol I-IV. . Karl Jacoby. In Aedibus B.G. Teubneri. Leipzig. 1885. Greek text available at the Perseus Digital Library.
 Homer, The Iliad with an English Translation by A.T. Murray, Ph.D. in two volumes. Cambridge, MA., Harvard University Press; London, William Heinemann, Ltd. 1924. Online version at the Perseus Digital Library.
 Homer, Homeri Opera in five volumes. Oxford, Oxford University Press. 1920. Greek text available at the Perseus Digital Library.
 Publius Vergilius Maro, Aeneid. Theodore C. Williams. trans. Boston. Houghton Mifflin Co. 1910. Online version at the Perseus Digital Library.
 Publius Vergilius Maro, Bucolics, Aeneid, and Georgics. J. B. Greenough. Boston. Ginn & Co. 1900. Latin text available at the Perseus Digital Library.

Trojans
Characters in the Aeneid
Kings of Alba Longa
Kings in Greek mythology
Characters in Book VI of the Aeneid
Capua (ancient city)